Glenn Foster Jr. (May 31, 1990 – December 6, 2021) was an American professional football player who was a defensive end in the National Football League (NFL). He played college football for the Illinois Fighting Illini.

Professional career
On April 28, 2013, he signed with the New Orleans Saints as an undrafted free agent.

On August 6, 2015, he was waived by the Saints.

Personal life and death
Foster attended Mount Carmel High School in Chicago, where he started playing football only as a sophomore, and spent much of his time developing an interest in business.  Retired from the NFL in 2016, since then he had been focusing on his efforts in real estate development and sales, together with his wife Pamela (who earned her own general contractor's license in 2014).

On December 6, 2021, Foster died shortly after being put into custody by police in Pickens County, Alabama. His cause of death is under investigation. An autopsy showed evidence of "neck compressions and strangulation".

The family of Foster has filed a lawsuit against Carriage Services Inc., the Louisiana funeral home that has been hired to handle his remains. The funeral home is alleged to have improperly handled his remains and to have destroyed his brain without authorization or consent by the family; his family had wanted to have Foster’s brain examined for signs of chronic traumatic encephalopathy. They are being represented by Benjamin Crump and Kenneth Abbarno.

References

External links
Illinois bio
New Orleans Saints bio

1990 births
2021 deaths
American football defensive ends
Players of American football from Chicago
Illinois Fighting Illini football players
New Orleans Saints players
People who died in police custody
African-American-related controversies
Deaths by strangulation in the United States
American people who died in prison custody
Prisoners who died in Alabama detention